Bradley Walsh & Son: Breaking Dad is a British television series in which the comedian and presenter Bradley Walsh is taken by his son Barney on a coming of age road trip across several countries. To date, four series have aired, plus a Christmas Special, all of which were narrated by Alexander Armstrong. The title of the series is a play on the American crime drama Breaking Bad. The fifth series premiered on 10 January 2023.

Overview 
Bradley Walsh and his son Barney visit countries in an RV whilst partaking in challenges along the way.

Transmissions

Episodes

Series 1 (2019)

Series 2 (2020)

Series 3 (2021)
The third series was originally planned for broadcast from 4 January 2021, but was pulled back a week because of Boris Johnson's Prime Ministerial broadcast.

Christmas Special (2021)

Series 4 (2022)

Series 5 (2023)

Reception 
The Times stated, "Bradley Walsh and his son took a good-natured road trip to the US, but it all seemed like an excuse to get Walsh Jr some TV exposure."

The series achieved average viewing figures of 5 million an episode, making it Britain's highest rating celebrity travelogue in nearly 10 years.

A critical Radio Times review said that the show had "a distinct feel of scripted banter" and that Bradley Walsh was in "his least-convincing role to date".

Some fans want episodes of Breaking Dad to be longer.

Notes

References

External links

Bradley Walsh
2019 British television series debuts
2010s British reality television series
2020s British reality television series
British adventure television series
ITV reality television shows
English-language television shows
Television series by Hungry Bear Media